Phaecasiophora astrata is a moth of the family Tortricidae. It is found in Vietnam.

The wingspan is about 23 mm. The ground colour of the forewings is dark rust brown, with a dark brown termen. The postbasal and postmedian areas are tinged orange brown. There is a white mark at the costa apically and there are numerous refractive bluish dots. The hindwings are brown.

Etymology
The name refers to the refractive dots of the forewing and is derived from Latin astratus (meaning with stars).

References

Moths described in 2009
Olethreutini
Moths of Asia
Taxa named by Józef Razowski